Might and Delight is a Swedish video game development studio and publisher based in Stockholm. The studio was established in 2010 and is best known for the Shelter series.

History
Might and Delight formed in 2010, comprising a team of 11, who had previously worked at Grin on Bionic Commando Rearmed. The team's initial goal was to create simple games that provided "something fresh and accessible". When the studio formed and began work on its first game, Pid, the development team was very enthusiastic to create a good game, and entered a long period of crunch, with some developers working 14–17 hours per day. Looking back at this period, CEO Anders Westin said "Ambition is dangerous, we shouldn't have let them do that". For the studio's next project, Shelter, the team ensured they didn't increase the scope of the game too far, and didn't encourage overtime.

In 2015 the studio announced that it would also begin publishing games, focusing on games with distinctive art styles and strong themes.

Games

Shelter 2 and Paws were additionally released for the Nintendo Switch in a bundle titled Shelter Generations. In 2015 Might and Delight announced Child of Cooper, a surreal exploration game - it was cancelled three months before its release the same year as a result of low interest in the game. For the early access multiplayer game Book of Travels, Might and Delight ran a successful Kickstarter campaign in 2019 to fund development. In 2021, following the disappointing early access launch of Book of Travels, the studio laid off around 25 staff, reducing their total headcount to 10.

In addition to games developed by Might and Delight, the studio also published Pan-Pan, developed by Spelkraft, in 2016.

References

External links

Video game companies of Sweden
Swedish companies established in 2010
Companies based in Stockholm
Video game development companies
Video game publishers
Video game companies established in 2010